The Monroe County, New York, Department of Transportation maintains  of roads as county routes. Unlike most counties in New York, Monroe County does not post reassurance markers along its county routes. In fact, the only field reference to a route's designation are reference markers posted at bridges and culverts along the highway, which carry the county route number on the second line. Routes that do not cross either type of structure at some point are completely unsigned. As a result, county routes in Monroe County are widely known by their road name and not by their number.

Route numbers were initially assigned across the county from east to west, beginning at the Wayne County line and generally progressing westward to the Orleans County line. Subsequent routes (those above County Route 238 or CR 238) do not follow this pattern and are located in all areas of the county. As a general rule, east–west routes have designations ending in an odd number while north–south highways carry designations ending in an even number. Several county routes partially or wholly overlap with New York state touring routes, serving as internal designations for county-maintained segments of those routes.

2007 system changes
Several county routes were created, modified, or eliminated following a November 26, 2007, highway maintenance swap between Monroe County and the state of New York. The transaction gave ownership of several county highways to the state, specifically county-maintained sections of New York State Route 19 (NY 19), NY 31, NY 252, NY 259, NY 260, and NY 441, and the county-owned Colonel Patrick O'Rorke Memorial Bridge. In return, the county assumed maintenance of five reference routes (NY 940G, NY 941L, NY 941P, NY 942B, and NY 943B), two sections of NY 386, and all of NY 252A and NY 360.

All of the county route numbers assigned to the formerly county-owned sections of state routes were eliminated except for CR 236, assigned to a portion of NY 31 on Redman Road west of Brockport, and CR 99, assigned to the O'Rorke Bridge and Pattonwood Drive between the Rochester city line and CR 124. The now-state-owned section of Redman Road split the formerly continuous CR 236 into two segments, while CR 99 was truncated to begin at the east end of the new NY 943F at CR 124.

CR 236 was also one of several routes that gained mileage as part of the swap. The highway was extended northward from its previous terminus at the junction of Redman and Church (NY 360) roads to cover two previously state-maintained sections of Redman Road in the far northwestern corner of the county, creating an overlap with part of NY 360 and replacing NY 941P, itself formerly NY 215. CR 1, previously assigned to the portion of Lake Road east of NY 250, was extended west to the Irondequoit Bay outlet over former NY 941L, once the easternmost segment of NY 18. CR 270 and CR 84 were also extended to cover NY 942B and NY 940G, respectively.

Four other routes—CR 119, CR 158, CR 168, and CR 234—were modified to cover now county-owned parts of NY 252A, NY 360, and NY 386 that connected to one of the county route's previous endpoints. Lastly, four additional highways transferred to the county—two sections of NY 386, a piece of NY 360, and NY 943B—received new county route designations.

Routes 1–50

Routes 51–100

Routes 101–150

Routes 151–200

Routes 201–250

Routes 251 and up

See also

County routes in New York
List of reference routes in New York

References